HSwMS Västergötland (Vgd) is the lead ship of the s. She is named after Västergötland, Sweden.

Development 
The submarine design combined the best properties from the preceding  and es. Submarines of the Västergötland class had greater submarine hunting capacity than previous classes, partly due to the fact that they were equipped with a new modern submarine  torpedo. The submarines in the Västergötland class were able to fire up to six heavy and six light wire-guided torpedoes at the same time against different targets, a world record of perhaps dubious benefit that probably still stands today.

After significant upgrades, these two submarines were reclassified to a new .

Service in Sweden 

Service in Singapore 
HSwMS Västergötland was renamed RSS Swordsman. Singapore's Ministry of Defence (MINDEF) signed an agreement with Kockums for the supply of two  (formerly Västergötland-class) submarines to the Republic of Singapore Navy (RSN) on 4 November 2005. More than 20 years old and previously in reserve with the Swedish Navy, the submarines were transferred to the RSN on completion of the modernisation and conversion for operation in tropical waters. RSS Archer was launched on 16 June 2009. RSS Archer underwent sea trials following its launch and is now operational. The second submarine, RSS Swordsman, was launched on 20 October 2010. The Archer-class submarines entered service in 2013 and replaced the s that were retired in 2015.

In October 2018, RSS Swordsman participated in Exercise Bersama Lima as part of the Five-Power-Defence-Arrangement exercise and was noted to have performed well, remaining undetected by the participating ships in the anti-submarine warfare exercise. 

In November 2018, the Republic of Singapore Navy announced on its official Facebook page that RSS Swordsman successfully conducted a live torpedo firing in the Andaman Sea.

Gallery

References 

Västergötland-class submarines
Ships built in Malmö
1986 ships
Archer-class submarines
Republic of Singapore Navy